Benjamin Okezie Kalu, is a Nigerian politician and a member of the House of Representatives in the 9th Nigeria National Assembly, representing Bende federal constituency, Abia State. He is currently the spokesperson of the House of Representatives and the Chairman, House Committee on Media and Public Affairs.

Life, education and political career
Benjamin Okezie Kalu graduated from the University of Calabar, where he served as a student representative at twenty three years. At twenty nine years, he served as the national chapter of the PDP in diaspora. He served as the youngest local government chairman of Bende, Abia State, Nigeria at the age of thirty one. At thirty four years, he served as the senior special adviser to the then governor of Abia State Orji Uzor Kalu on local government and chieftaincy affairs, before becoming the senior special adviser to the governor on Millennium Development Goals and international relations at the age of thirty five.

Kalu started his political career in 2002 by contesting for the House of Representatives primaries and losing to Mbah Ajah. In 2011 and 2015, he contested for the House of Representatives election, representing Progressive Peoples Alliance at that time, but lost in both elections. On 23 February 2019, Kalu, representing the ruling All Progressives Congress defeated Chima Anyaso of the People's Democratic Party and won the seat to represent Bende federal constituency, Abia State in the House of Representatives. He received 9,138 votes, while Anyaso received 5,591 votes. Anyaso rejected the result of the election and challenged the victory of Kalu in the National and State Assembly Election Petitions tribunal, citing irregularities in the election. On 29 August 2019, the tribunal dismissed the petition for lacking merit and upheld the election of Kalu. After losing at the tribunal, Anyaso appealed the case at the Imo State Appeal court, Owerri. On 28 October 2019, the Appeal court upheld Kalu's election. Kalu is currently the spokesperson of the House of Representatives and the Chairman, House Committee on Media and Public Affairs.

Personal life
Kalu is from Bende, Abia State, Nigeria. He is married with 5 children.

References

Living people
People from Abia State
All Progressives Congress politicians
Abia State politicians
Nigerian political candidates
University of Calabar alumni
Year of birth missing (living people)